The Soo Line Railroad Bridge, known locally as the S-Bridge, is a steel Warren deck truss bridge over the Eau Claire River in Eau Claire, Wisconsin, United States. It was built by the Minneapolis Steel and Machinery Company in 1910 for the Soo Line Railroad to replace an 1890 wooden bridge. The bridge bends in an S shape over its 442 foot length in order to allow trains to cross the Eau Claire River on gentle curves between the parallel tracks located on either side of the river. The bridge was abandoned in 1991 and turned into a trail in 2002. The bridge was listed on the National Register of Historic Places on August 12, 2022.

See also
 List of bridges on the National Register of Historic Places in Wisconsin
 National Register of Historic Places listings in Eau Claire County, Wisconsin

References

External links
 

1910 establishments in Wisconsin
Bridges completed in 1910
Railway bridges on the National Register of Historic Places in Wisconsin
Buildings and structures in Eau Claire County, Wisconsin
Warren truss bridges in the United States
National Register of Historic Places in Eau Claire County, Wisconsin
Railroad bridges in Wisconsin
Soo Line Railroad
Transportation in Eau Claire County, Wisconsin
Steel bridges in the United States